The Dutch Eredivisie in the 1965–66 season was contested by 16 teams. Ajax won the championship. Only one team relegated this year, because next year, the number of participants would be 18 again.

Teams

A total of 16 teams are taking part in the league.

League standings

Results

See also
 1965–66 Eerste Divisie
 1965–66 Tweede Divisie

References

 Eredivisie official website - info on all seasons 
 RSSSF
 Het vrĳe volk - 21 August 1965 

Eredivisie seasons
Netherlands
1965–66 in Dutch football